Megachile circumcincta is a species of bee in the family Megachilidae. It was described by William Kirby in 1802.

References

Circumcincta
Insects described in 1802